Mortdale railway station is located on the Illawarra line, serving the Sydney suburb of Mortdale. It is served by Sydney Trains T4 line services.

History
Mortdale station opened on 20 March 1897 being relocated north to its current location on 14 September 1922 when a new deviation of the Illawarra line opened. South of the station lies the Mortdale Maintenance Depot.

In March 2007 the station was upgrade with lifts added.

Platforms & services

Transport links
Punchbowl Bus Company operates three routes via Mortdale station:
944: to Bankstown station
945: Hurstville to Bankstown station
955: to Hurstville via Oatley

station is served by one NightRide route:
N10: Sutherland station to Town Hall station

Trackplan

References

External links

Mortdale station details Transport for New South Wales

Easy Access railway stations in Sydney
Railway stations in Sydney
Railway stations in Australia opened in 1897
Railway stations in Australia opened in 1922
Illawarra railway line
Georges River Council